Rodrigo Etchart (born January 24, 1994) is an Argentine rugby sevens player. He was named in 's sevens team for the 2016 Summer Olympics.

References

External links
 UAR Profile
 
 
 
 

1994 births
Living people
Argentine people of French descent
Male rugby sevens players
Argentine rugby union players
Olympic rugby sevens players of Argentina
Argentina international rugby sevens players
Rugby sevens players at the 2016 Summer Olympics
Pan American Games medalists in rugby sevens
Pan American Games silver medalists for Argentina
Rugby sevens players at the 2015 Pan American Games
Medalists at the 2015 Pan American Games
Rugby sevens players at the 2020 Summer Olympics
Olympic medalists in rugby sevens
Medalists at the 2020 Summer Olympics
Olympic bronze medalists for Argentina
Sportspeople from Buenos Aires